Niphona fuscatrix is a species of beetle in the family Cerambycidae. It was described by Johan Christian Fabricius in 1792. It is known from India.

References

fuscatrix
Beetles described in 1792